Jacynta Prema de Nieva Galabadaarachchi (born 6 June 2001) is an Australian professional soccer player who plays as a forward for Scottish Women's Premier League club Celtic and the Australia women's national under-20 team. In February 2017, she was called up to training camp with the senior national team.

Early life
Galabadaarachchi began playing soccer at age five after watching her brother play. At age 9, English club Manchester United contacted Galabadaarachchi to come for a trial. She was later invited to Manchester City W.F.C. Academy and spent eight weeks training with the team. At age 14, her request to play for an under-15 boys premier league team was denied by Football Federation Victoria; the decision was later overturned.

Galabadaarachchi's father is originally from Sri Lanka. She also has Italian citizenship through her maternal grandparents.

Club career

Melbourne City, 2016–2017
In October 2016 at age 15, Galabadaarachchi signed with Melbourne City for the 2016–17 season, and made five appearances for the club, playing primarily as a striker. After getting limited playing time at Melbourne City, Galabadaarachchi went to England and trained with various professional teams over there. Despite offers she was unable to sign a pro contract as she was under 18.

Perth Glory, 2018–2019
Galabadaarachchi returned to Australia and signed with Perth Glory for the 2018–19 W-League season.

West Ham United, 2019–2020
In July 2019, Galabadaarachchi secured a move to English FA WSL side West Ham United.

Napoli, 2020–2021
Galabadaarachchi signed on loan with Italian team Napoli in September 2020.

Celtic, 2021–

Galabadaarachchi signed for SWPL side Celtic F.C. Women in February 2021

International career
Galabadaarachchi is eligible to represent Australia, Sri Lanka, Argentina and Italy in international football, and has represented the Australian Under-17 team. In February 2017, she was called up for the Matildas for training camp ahead of the 2017 Algarve Cup.

Career statistics

Club

Honours 
 with Melbourne City
 W-League Champions: 2016–17

Celtic

SWPL League Cup: 2022

See also
 Women's association football in Australia

References

Further reading
 Grainey, Timothy (2012), Beyond Bend It Like Beckham: The Global Phenomenon of Women's Soccer, University of Nebraska Press, 
 Stewart, Barbara (2012), Women's Soccer: The Passionate Game, Greystone Books,

External links
 
 

2001 births
Living people
Australian women's soccer players
Women's association football forwards
Melbourne City FC (A-League Women) players
Perth Glory FC (A-League Women) players
A-League Women players
West Ham United F.C. Women players
Women's Super League players
Serie A (women's football) players
Celtic F.C. Women players
Scottish Women's Premier League players
Australian expatriate women's soccer players
Australian expatriate sportspeople in England
Expatriate footballers in England
Australian people of Sri Lankan descent
Australian people of Argentine descent
Australian people of Italian descent
S.S.D. Napoli Femminile players
Australian expatriate sportspeople in Scotland
Australian expatriate sportspeople in Italy
Expatriate women's footballers in Scotland
Expatriate women's footballers in Italy
Soccer players from Melbourne
Sportswomen from Victoria (Australia)